Andrew Grant Whitfield (born 24 November 1982) is a South African politician who has been the Shadow Minister of Police since 2019 and a Member of the National Assembly for the Democratic Alliance since 2019 and previously from 2014 to 2016. Having served as the provincial chairman of the DA in the Eastern Cape from 2017 to 2023, he is currently the provincial leader of the party and the leader of the party's Tsitsi-Kouga Constituency. Whitfield had previously served on the Nelson Mandela Bay city council and in the Eastern Cape Provincial Legislature.

Political career
Whitfield joined the Democratic Alliance and was elected to the Nelson Mandela Bay city council in 2011. After the general election in May 2014, he was sworn in as a Member of the National Assembly. The following month, he was assigned to the Portfolio Committee on Tourism.

After the 2016 municipal elections, Whitfield returned to the Nelson Mandela Bay council as the DA became the largest party. The DA's Athol Trollip was elected mayor, and Whitfield was appointed by Trollip as the member of the mayoral committee (MMC) responsible for the economic development, tourism and agriculture portfolio. On 6 May 2017, Whitfield was elected as the provincial chairperson of the DA in the Eastern Cape, succeeding Veliswa Mvenya.

In June 2018, the DA redeployed Whitfield to the Eastern Cape Provincial Legislature; he was sworn in as an MPL on 28 June 2018. He returned to the National Assembly following the May 2019 general election. In June 2019, he was appointed as Shadow Minister of Police and as the leader of the DA's Tsitsi-Kouga Constituency.

In August 2020, he was re-elected unopposed as provincial chairperson of the DA. Whitfield remained in his post as shadow police minister in  John Steenhuisen's Shadow Cabinet.

On 4 March 2022, Whitfield suggested that legislation be proposed to allow Parliament to oversee the workings of the National Security Council (NSC). The NSC was established by proclamation by president Cyril Ramaphosa in February 2020. Currently, the NSC does its work without any parliamentary oversight.

On 1 September 2022, Whitfield was appointed a DA whip in the National Assembly following the resignation of long-serving DA MP Annette Steyn, who also comes from the Eastern Cape.

After Nqaba Bhanga made his intention to stand down as DA provincial leader known in early-January 2023 ahead of the party's provincial elective conference,  Whitfield announced in a letter sent to DA members in the Eastern Cape on 13 January that he intends to contest the position of provincial leader at the party's provincial conference in February. He  was elected provincial leader on 25 February at the party's conference in Graaff-Reinet, defeating fellow Member of Parliament and the party's deputy provincial leader in the province, Chantel King.

References

External links
Profile at Parliament of South Africa

Living people
1982 births
White South African people
People from Port Elizabeth
Democratic Alliance (South Africa) politicians
Members of the National Assembly of South Africa
21st-century South African politicians
Members of the Eastern Cape Provincial Legislature